Carolane Soucisse (born February 10, 1995) is a Canadian ice dancer. With her skating partner, Shane Firus, she is the 2018 Four Continents silver medallist.  They have finished third at the 2020 Canadian Championships and represented Canada on the Grand Prix circuit and at the World Championships.

She previously competed with Alexandre Laliberté and Benjamin Smyth in the novice and junior ranks and Simon Tanguay in the junior and senior ranks.

Personal life
Carolane Soucisse was born on February 10, 1995, in Châteauguay, Québec, Canada. Her mother is Nathalie Guay.

Career

2000 to 2012 
Soucisse began learning to skate in 2000. With Alexandre Laliberté, she became the pre-novice bronze medallist at the 2010 Canadian Championships. She skated the following two seasons in the junior ranks with Benjamin Smyth. The duo placed 10th at the 2011 Canadian Championships and withdrew from the 2012 edition. They were coached by Bruno Yvars and Martine Patenaude in Montréal.

Partnership with Tanguay 
Soucisse and Simon Tanguay began competing together in the 2012–2013 season, coached by Marie-France Dubreuil, Patrice Lauzon, and Pascal Denis in Montréal. They placed 9th competing on the junior level at the 2013 Canadian Championships.

The following season, they placed sixth at an ISU Junior Grand Prix event in Belarus and fifth in junior ice dancing at the 2014 Canadian Championships.

Soucisse/Tanguay made their senior-level debut in the 2014–2015 season. Their coaching team remained the same except for the addition of Romain Haguenauer. The duo finished 9th at the 2015 Canadian Championships.

They won bronze at the Lake Placid Ice Dance International, held in July 2015, and at the International Cup of Nice in October. After placing 8th at the 2016 Canadian Championships, they decided to part ways.

2016–2017 season: Debut of Soucisse/Firus 
Soucisse partnered with Shane Firus in 2016. They decided to train in Montréal under the guidance of Marie-France Dubreuil and Patrice Lauzon. The two placed seventh at the 2017 CS Autumn Classic International and had the same result at the International Cup of Nice. They finished fourth at the 2017 Canadian Championships.

2017–2018 season 
Soucisse/Firus participated in two ISU Challenger Series events, placing fifth at the 2017 CS U.S. International Figure Skating Classic and fourth at the 2017 CS Finlandia Trophy.  They then made their Grand Prix debut at the 2017 Skate Canada International, where they placed seventh. 

In January, they placed third in the short dance, fourth in the free dance, and fourth overall at the 2018 Canadian Championships.  As the fourth-place finisher, they were assigned to the 2018 Four Continents Championships, their first ISU Championship event.  They placed third in the short and second in the free, winning the silver medal.  Firus said the two were "ecstatic" at the result, having achieved their goal of a medal.

Following the 2018 Winter Olympics, Tessa Virtue and Scott Moir withdrew from Canada's delegation to the 2018 World Championships in Milan.  Soucisse/Firus, as the first alternates, took their places, making their World Championship debut.  They placed eleventh in the short dance, fourteenth in the free dance, and fourteenth overall.

2018–2019 season 
Soucisse/Firus began their season at the 2018 CS Autumn Classic International, where they won the bronze medal after placing third in the rhythm dance and fourth in the free dance.  Firus remarked that he felt they had left a few technical points on the table but was otherwise satisfied with their performance.  At their second Challenger event, the 2018 CS Finlandia Trophy, they finished fourth overall, having placed third in the rhythm dance and fifth in the free skate following an error from Soucisse on the one-foot step sequence in the latter.

The duo had two Grand Prix events for the season, beginning with the 2018 Skate Canada International, where a fall on the midline step left them in ninth place after the rhythm dance.  They subsequently placed seventh in the free dance and eighth overall.  At their second event, 2018 NHK Trophy, they placed fifth in both segments and fifth overall, setting a new personal best in the free dance.

Following the Grand Prix, the two opted to return to their previous season's free dance, as the Weeknd medley they had been using had not received the scores they would have wanted.  They placed fourth in the rhythm dance at the 2019 Canadian Championships.  The free dance proved difficult, with Soucisse struggling on her twizzles and falling toward the end of the program. They were sixth in the free dance and dropped to fifth overall.

2019–2020 season 
Soucisse/Firus were assigned to two Challenger events to begin the season, placing fifth at the 2019 CS Autumn Classic International before winning the bronze medal at the 2019 CS U.S. Classic.

On the Grand Prix, they were seventh to begin at the 2019 Internationaux de France.  Soucisse/Firus placed eighth at the 2019 NHK Trophy.

With training mates and presumptive silver medalists Fournier Beaudry/Sørensen sitting out the 2020 Canadian Championships, Soucisse/Firus competed with Lajoie/Lagha for the silver medal. Both teams made errors in the rhythm dance, with Soucisse putting her free foot down to regain balance at one point in the Finnstep pattern dance, and Soucisse/Firus placed third in that segment.  Early in the free dance, Firus fell on the one-foot step sequence, and they finished third in that segment as well, winning the bronze medal.  They were assigned to compete at the 2020 Four Continents Championships in Seoul.  They placed seventh at Four Continents, with Firus falling again in the free dance. 

Following the results of Four Continents, Soucisse/Firus were named as alternates for the Canadian team to the 2020 World Figure Skating Championships and subsequently were added to the team after Fournier Beaudry/Sørensen were judged unable to compete. Shortly afterward, the World Championships were cancelled due to the COVID-19 pandemic, which they later called "a big low" for them. On April 16, 2020, Soucisse/Firus announced that they would be moving to train at the Scarboro Figure Skating Club under Carol and Jon Lane  and Juris Razgulajevs.

2020–2021 season 
Soucisse/Firus were assigned to the 2020 Skate Canada International, but this event was also cancelled due to the pandemic. Due to a minor training injury, they were unable to participate in filming for the virtual 2021 Skate Canada Challenge and were granted a bye to the 2021 Canadian Championships. However, the championships were subsequently cancelled.

Soucisse/Firus were named as alternates to the 2021 World Championships. With Canada's mandatory two-week quarantine for returning athletes, however, no member of the World team was assigned to the 2021 World Team Trophy, and Soucisse/Firus were assigned as Canada's entry in the dance segment. They placed sixth in both of their segments of the competition, and Team Canada finished in sixth place.

2021–2022 season 
Soucisse/Firus made their season debut at the 2021 CS Autumn Classic International, where they placed fifth. They were eleventh at the 2021 CS Finlandia Trophy after a rhythm dance error left them in fourteenth place after that segment. Soucisse said, "there's some work to do on the rhythm dance, but the programs are taking form and trending in the right direction."

On the Grand Prix, Soucisse/Firus placed seventh at the 2021 Skate America. They were initially assigned to the 2021 Cup of China as their second Grand Prix, but following its cancellation they were reassigned to the 2021 Gran Premio d'Italia. They placed seventh there as well, with Firus saying they were happy with their free dance performance.

Competing at the 2022 Canadian Championships, Soucisse/Firus finished in fourth place. They were fourth as well at the 2022 Four Continents Championships.

2022–2023 season
Beginning the season at the 2022 CS Nebelhorn Trophy, Soucisse/Firus won the bronze medal, their first international medal since 2019. They finished eighth at the 2022 Skate America, their first Grand Prix assignment. Soucisse/Firus then came sixth at the 2022 Grand Prix of Espoo. They finished fourth at the 2023 Canadian Championships.

Programs

With Firus

With Tanguay

With Smyth

Competitive highlights 
GP: Grand Prix; CS: Challenger Series; JGP: Junior Grand Prix

With Firus

With Tanguay

With Laliberté and Smyth

Detailed results 
''Small medals for short and free programs awarded only at ISU Championships. At team events, medals awarded for team results only.  Current ISU personal bests highlighted in bold.

With Firus

References

External links 
 
 Carolane Soucisse / Shane Firus at Skate Canada

1995 births
Canadian female ice dancers
Living people
People from Châteauguay
Four Continents Figure Skating Championships medalists